Tsuen Wan New Town is a new town in Hong Kong. It spans Tsuen Wan, Kwai Chung and the eastern part of Tsing Yi Island. Traditionally, the administrative officials of Tsuen Wan managed the area of Tsuen Wan proper, Kwai Chung, Tsing Yi Island, Ma Wan and Northeast Lantau Island. The population of the new town is approximately 801,800, with the planned capacity being 845,000.

Development of the Tsuen Wan satellite town commenced in the 1950s, along with Kwun Tong satellite town. In 1961, the government of Hong Kong decided to expand the satellite town into neighbouring Kwai Chung and Tsing Yi, and Tsuen Wan New Town was established as the first new town in Hong Kong. In 1982, the Tsuen Wan District was created under the District Administration Scheme. In 1985, with the explosion of population in the new town, Kwai Chung and Tsing Yi were spun off to form the new Kwai Tsing District. Thus, the town is now under two administrative districts. In some recent official reports, Kwai Chung New Town and Tsing Yi New Town are separated from Tsuen Wan New Town.

Despite being a part of the New Territories, the town is also considered a part of the Hong Kong metro area by the Planning Department and Urban Renewal Authority. Along with Hong Kong Island and Kowloon, it is the only area in the New Territories classified as the core urban area of Hong Kong. Part of this is because the town was developed early and is not geographically separated from Kowloon by hills. Also, there are no New Territories taxis service within most parts of the town, unlike other new towns in the New Territories.

See also  
 List of places in Hong Kong

References

Further reading

External links 
 Civil Engineering and Development Department: Tsuen Wan New Town
 New Territories Development Department: Hong Kong's New Towns: Tsuen Wan

New towns in Hong Kong
Kwai Chung
Kwai Tsing District
Tsing Yi
Tsuen Wan
Tsuen Wan District
New towns started in the 1980s